The St. Louis Hotel was built in 1838 at the corner of St. Louis and Chartres Street in New Orleans, Louisiana, United States. Originally it was referred to as the City Exchange Hotel.

A hotel exists in the same place today but with a different name, the Omni Royal Orleans.

Origin
Creoles of New Orleans built the hotel to rival an Anglo-American-made hotel at the time near Canal Street on the upriver side, called the St. Charles Hotel. In February 1838, a contract for the French Quarter hotel's construction was signed; it was given the name "The City Exchange". The hotel was the center of social activities for Creoles and visiting Europeans. It was meant to be a creole place; a place for aristocrats to eat, drink, make love, and buy and sell slaves. J.N.B. de Pouilly was the architect for the hotel.

Slave market

Walking into the hotel, one could see the large auction block where slaves were sold. The auction block was under the grand rotunda of the building. Some slaves were brought in by sea from Baltimore, only for a number of them to be sold immediately upon disembarking. Others were put into slave pens in the French Quarter.

The St. Louis Hotel was where Maspero's Exchange was located, which was just one of about fifty businesses in New Orleans to sell slaves. An example of the revenue produced by selling slaves at this location is from one auctioneer, Joseph Le Carpentier, whose slave sales totaled $57,075 in 1840, the equivalent of which is $1,585,416.67 in 2015.

Notable events
The original hotel was host to a wide range of important people within the South. During the pre-Civil War period, the hotel was host to a large number of balls and meetings, the most well known being the bal travesti, where Henry Clay gave his only speech in New Orleans.

On occasion, the state legislature held sessions in the hotel's grand rotunda.

1838 to 1915
The St. Louis Hotel has a long and extensive history of having to be rebuilt and revamped since its opening in 1838. In 1841, the hotel, then known as the St. Louis Exchange hotel, experienced a huge fire that swept through the four-story building, destroying it completely. However, the hotel was quickly rebuilt with the help of funding from the Citizens Bank at a cost of $600,000. This time, though, the building was rebuilt with "fire-resistant components such as a lightweight rotunda composed of a honeycomb of hollow clay pots".

For the next twenty years, the new building was a central location for 'French New Orleans', hosting many lavish banquets and balls until the 1862 capture of New Orleans by Union forces during the American Civil War. The hotel became a military hospital for Union soldiers; it had lost its grandeur and elegance. During the Reconstruction Era (1865-1877), it was sold to the state of Louisiana and became “the de facto Louisiana state capitol."

After the disputed gubernatorial election of 1876, the St. Louis became the home base of Republican Stephen B. Packard, where he was effectively trapped by armed members of the pro-Democratic White League, which had taken control of New Orleans. On February 15, 1877, a would-be assassin named William H. Weldon broke into Packard's office at the hotel and shot him, though he was only slightly wounded.

Two months later, it was at the St. Louis Hotel where Packard formally relinquished his claim to the governor's seat after President Rutherford B. Hayes ordered the withdrawal of U.S. troops as part of Compromise of 1877 — the formal end of Reconstruction.

For many years, the hotel passed from one owner to the next, serving various purposes such as a bank and a restaurant. Unfortunately, the building slowly began to decay, "like the French Quarter around it", amounting to nothing but "crumbling marble walls". A few years later, due to the hurricane of 1915, the building was completely destroyed; all that remained was a heap of rubble. The once "prime real estate would serve as nothing more than a salvage yard for decades to come".

Royal Orleans hotel

After much discussion among New Orleanians as to restoring the charm and prominence of the French Quarter, the hotel was rebuilt in 1960, now as the Royal Orleans. The 20th-century hotel encompassed the same European grand design as the old one, including the "exact drawings of the remaining stone arches ... and [the] exact duplicates of the Spanish wrought iron railings" which had once graced the hotel. Omni Hotels of Dallas, Texas, took over the hotel's lease in 1986, and named it the Omni Royal Orleans. As of 2008, Omni maintained a 25% stake in the property and continued to manage it.

References

External links

Antebellum Louisiana: Urban Life at the Louisiana State Museum
2015 slavery exhibit, Historic New Orleans Collection at The Times-Picayune 

1838 establishments in Louisiana
French Quarter
Hotels in New Orleans
Defunct hotels in Louisiana